Metrioidea atriceps is a species of skeletonizing leaf beetle in the family Chrysomelidae. It is found in North America.

References

Further reading

 
 

Galerucinae
Articles created by Qbugbot
Beetles described in 1893
Taxa named by George Henry Horn